D. J. Williams may refer to:

D. J. Williams (linebacker) (born 1982), retired American football linebacker
D. J. Williams (tight end) (born 1988), retired American football tight end
D. J. Williams (Welsh nationalist) (1885–1970), Welsh-language writer and political activist
D. J. Williams (politician) (1897–1972), British miner and checkweighman who became a Labour Party Member of Parliament
D. J. Williams (actor) (1868–1949), British actor

See also 
 List of people with surname Williams